Montbard is a commune and subprefecture of the Côte-d'Or department in the Bourgogne-Franche-Comté region in eastern France.

Montbard is a small industrial town on the river Brenne. The Forges  de Buffon, ironworks established by Buffon, are located in the nearby village of Buffon.  There has been a cricket team in the town since 1993.

History
Montbard is near the site of the Cistercian Abbey of Fontenay, which became a UNESCO World Heritage Site in 1981.

The chateau was the scene of the marriage of Anne de Bourgogne and John of Lancaster, Duke of Bedford in 1423. It was acquired by the naturalist Georges-Louis Leclerc, Comte de Buffon, who was born in Montbard.

Geography

Climate
Montbard has a oceanic climate (Köppen climate classification Cfb).

Population

Attractions
 Abbey of Fontenay

Transportation
Some TGV express trains between Paris and Dijon and several regional trains stop at Montbard station.

The Burgundy Canal also passes through the town.

Personalities

Births 
Montbard was the birthplace of:
 Jean Bardin (1732–1809), historical painter
 Pierre Daubenton (1703–1776), lawyer, politician, author and Encyclopédiste
 Georges-Louis Leclerc, Comte de Buffon (1707–1788), naturalist and mathematician
 Louis-Jean-Marie Daubenton, (1716–1800), naturalist and collaborator of Buffon
 Benjamin Guérard (1797–1854), historian and librarian
 Eugène Guillaume (1822–1905), sculptor
 George Montbard (1841–1905), caricaturist and author

Deaths
 Jean-Andoche Junot (1771–1813), general during the First French Empire, committed suicide in Montbard
 Pierre Daubenton (see births)

See also
 Communes of the Côte-d'Or department

References

Communes of Côte-d'Or
Subprefectures in France
Burgundy